Athanasios Mantzouranis (born 11 April 1982) is a retired Greek amateur track cyclist. He has won multiple titles in track time trial (kilo), sprint (individual and team), and Keirin at the Greek Championships since 1999, and later represented his nation Greece at the 2008 Summer Olympics.

Mantzouranis qualified for the Greek squad in two track cycling events at the 2008 Summer Olympics in Beijing by receiving a berth for his team based on the nation's selection process from the UCI Track World Rankings. Teaming with Vasileios Reppas and Panagiotis Voukelatos in the men's sprint race, held on the first day of track cycling, Mantzouranis recorded a time of 45.645 and a speed of 59.152 km/h to deliver the Greek trio a tenth-place finish in the prelims. The following day, in men's keirin, Mantzouranis missed a chance to advance further to the later rounds, after finishing fifth in the opening prelims, third in the repechage, and seventeenth overall from the final standings.

Career highlights

1998
  Greek Championships (500 m time trial), Novices (GRE)
  Greek Championships (Sprint), Novices (GRE)
  Greek Championships (Pursuit), Novices (GRE)
1999
  Athens Open Balkan Championships (Team sprint), Sofia (BUL)
  Greek Junior Championships (Sprint), Greece
  Greek Junior Championships (Team sprint), Greece
  Athens Open Balkan Championships (Sprint), Sofia (BUL)
2000
  Greek Junior Championships (1 km time trial), Greece
  Greek Junior Championships (Sprint), Greece
  Greek Junior Championships (Team sprint), Greece
2001
  Greek Championships (Sprint), Greece
  Greek Championships (Team sprint), Greece
  Greek Championships (1 km time trial), Greece
2002
  Greek Championships (1 km time trial), Greece
2004
  Athens Open Balkan Championships (1 km time trial), Athens (GRE)
  Greek Championships (Keirin), Athens (GRE)
  Greek Championships (1 km time trial), Athens (GRE)
  Athens Open Balkan Championships (Team sprint), Athens (GRE)
2005
  Greek Championships (1 km time trial), Greece
  Greek Championships (Team sprint), Greece
  Greek Road Championships (TTTl), Thiva (GRE)
2006
  Greek Championships (1 km time trial), Greece
  Greek Championships (Keirin), Greece
  Greek Championships (Sprint), Greece
2007
  Athens Open Balkan Championships (Sprint), Athens (GRE)
  Athens Open Balkan Championships (Team sprint with Christos Volikakis and Panagiotis Voukelatos), Athens (GRE)
  Greek Championships (1 km time trial), Greece
  Athens Open Balkan Championships (Keirin), Athens (GRE)
  Greek Championships (Team pursuit), Greece
  Greek Championships (Team sprint), Greece
2008
 10th Olympic Games (Team sprint with Vasileios Reppas and Panagiotis Voukelatos), Beijing (CHN)
 17th Olympic Games (Keirin), Beijing (CHN)

References

External links
NBC Olympics Profile

1982 births
Living people
Greek male cyclists
Greek track cyclists
Cyclists at the 2008 Summer Olympics
Olympic cyclists of Greece
Sportspeople from Thessaloniki